Ross Allen (born 12 August 1939) is an Australian cricketer. He played in one first-class match for Queensland in 1962/63. His father was Tom Allen who also represented Queensland in First-class cricket.

See also
 List of Queensland first-class cricketers

References

External links
 

1939 births
Living people
Australian cricketers
Queensland cricketers
Cricketers from Toowoomba